Stewartsville is an unincorporated community in Robb Township, Posey County, in the U.S. state of Indiana.

History
Stewartsville was originally called Paris, and under the latter name was laid out in 1838. The name was later changed to honor the community's founder, James Stuart. A post office was established under the name Stewartsville in 1852, and remained in operation until it was discontinued in 1982.

Geography

References

Unincorporated communities in Posey County, Indiana
Unincorporated communities in Indiana